Gravestone is an alternative name for a Headstone

Gravestone or Gravestones can also refer to:

Gravestone (band), a German heavy metal band
"Gravestones" (song), a song by Hawthorne Heights from their 2010 album Skeletons